Ilian Iliev (born 2 August 1966) is a Bulgarian equestrian. He competed in the individual eventing at the 1992 Summer Olympics.

References

1966 births
Living people
Bulgarian male equestrians
Olympic equestrians of Bulgaria
Equestrians at the 1992 Summer Olympics
Place of birth missing (living people)